Montclus is a commune in the Gard department in southern France.

Geography

Climate

Montclus has a hot-summer Mediterranean climate (Köppen climate classification Csa).

Population

See also
Communes of the Gard department
 Côtes du Vivarais AOC

References

Communes of Gard